SET domain containing 3 (SETD3) is a protein that in humans is encoded by the SETD3 gene. It is a methyl transferase implicated in the replication of all enteroviruses. A mouse line deficient in SETD3 expression was shown to be immune to enterovirus infection. This could pave the way for the prevention of diseases like the common cold, myocarditis, aseptic meningitis and polio.  SETD3 is capable of methylating the cytoskeletal protein actin on histidine residues.

In patients of the Estrogen Receptor-positive, and  Luminal A-type breast cancer classification, a high expression of SETD3 is associated with better relapse-free survival, whereas in patients lacking expression of estrogen-, progesterone- and HER2/neu-receptor, and those affected by a p53-mutation, SETD3 was associated with poor relapse-free survival.

Downregulation of SETD3 expression with small interfering RNA resulted in an inhibition of cytoskeletal function and invasiveness of triple-negative breast cancer cells.

See also 
 Methyltransferase
 Histone methyltransferase

References

Further reading

External links 
 PDBe-KB provides an overview of all the structure information available in the PDB for Human Actin-histidine N-methyltransferase (SETD3)